Catherine Ewa Ekuta (born 25 November 1979) is a Nigerian judoka who competed in the women's lightweight category. She picked up a gold and two bronze medals each in the 57-kg division at the All-Africa Games (1999 (bronze), 2003 (gold) and 2007 (bronze)). The gold medal was in 2003 All-Africa Games (Coja) Nigeria, in 57 kg she qualified and represented her nation Nigeria at the 2004 Summer Olympics.

Ekuta qualified for the two-member Nigerian judo squad in the women's lightweight class (57 kg) at the 2004 Summer Olympics in Athens, by winning  a gold medal in 2003 All-Africa Games (Coja) Nigeria, in 57 kg), she also placed third and receiving a berth from the African Championships in Tunis, Tunisia. Ekuta received a bye in the opening round, before crashing down the tatami to an ippon and a sleeve lifting and pulling hip throw (sode tsurikomi goshi) from Switzerland's Lena Göldi with just 44 seconds remaining in her first match.

References

External links
 
 

1979 births
Living people
Nigerian female judoka
Olympic judoka of Nigeria
Judoka at the 2004 Summer Olympics
Sportspeople from Lagos
African Games gold medalists for Nigeria
African Games medalists in judo
African Games bronze medalists for Nigeria
Competitors at the 1999 All-Africa Games
Competitors at the 2003 All-Africa Games
Competitors at the 2007 All-Africa Games
20th-century Nigerian women
21st-century Nigerian women